Vilshanka Raion was a raion (district) of Kirovohrad Oblast in central Ukraine. The administrative center of the raion was the urban-type settlement of Vilshanka. The raion was abolished on 18 July 2020 as part of the administrative reform of Ukraine, which reduced the number of raions of Kirovohrad Oblast to four. The area of Vilshanka Raion was merged into Holovanivsk Raion.

At the time of disestablishment, the raion consisted of one hromada, Vilshanka settlement hromada with the administration in Vilshanka.

References

Former raions of Kirovohrad Oblast
1919 establishments in Ukraine
Ukrainian raions abolished during the 2020 administrative reform